The 2014–15 Biathlon World Cup – World Cup 7 was held in Nové Město, Czech Republic, from 6 February until 8 February 2015.

Schedule of events

Medal winners

Men

Women

Mixed

Achievements
 Best performance for all time

 ,5th place in Pursuit and 7th place in Sprint
 , 16th place in Sprint
 , 25th place in Pursuit
 , 1st place in Sprint
 , 2nd place in Sprint
 , 8th place in Sprint
 , 13th place in Sprint
 , 19th place in Sprint
 , 4th place in Pursuit
 , 10th place in Pursuit and 14th place in Sprint
 , 12th place in Pursuit

 First World Cup race

References 

7
2015 in Czech sport
February 2015 sports events in Europe
World Cup - World Cup 7,2014-15